The E-segment is the 5th category of the European segments for passenger cars, synonymous with the term executive car.

E-Segment is a niche in Europe (2-3% penetration in 2010s). As of 2017, 2018, 2019 and 2020, E-segment sales account for 2.7%, 2.7%, 2.3% and 2.1% market share in Europe respectively.

Characteristics 
Most E-segment cars are sedans/saloons, however several models are also produced in other body styles such as wagons/estates and hatchbacks.

European vs. American classification 

The terms E-segment or executive car do not have a one-to-one equivalent in the American car classification. However, if a modern E-segment sedan by a European brand is sold in the U.S., it falls into the category of both mid-size and full-size sedan, usually a mid-size luxury sedan.

The American mid-size sedan classification spans both the D-segment and the E-segment. With size brackets of European car segments increasing, the Toyota Camry fell from the E-segment into the D-segment while remaining a mid-size car.

Current models 

In 2020 the highest selling E-segment cars in Europe were the Mercedes-Benz E-class, BMW 5 Series, Audi A6, Volvo V90/S90 and Porsche Taycan. 

50.000 - 100.000 sales (Best-Selling)

10.000 - 50.000 sales 

Fewer than 10.000 sales

Moved to F-segment

Sales figures in Europe 

Notes:

1. The table includes not only E-segment cars, but also a car fitting the F-segment in terms of size (the 2011 Chrysler 300).

2. Our source of information initial include BMW 8 Series in E-segment, but latter moved to F-segment.

Market share in Europe 
2019 - Sales of large cars in Europe were down 13% in 2019 to 362,300 units, a new record low annual volume for this class, which now accounts for 2.3% of the total European car market, down from 2.7% in 2018.

2020 - The large cars segment in Europe is down 32% in 2020, to just over 246,000 deliveries. This means the segment loses ground on the overall market again and now accounts for just 2.1% of the total European car market, down from 2.3% in 2019. With the exception of a newcomer, the entire top-8, which accounts for nearly 91% of the segment’s sales, drops by 29% or more and thus falls behind the overall market. Only one single model in the class manages to keep its decline limited to single digits.

See also 
 D-segment
 F-segment
 Euro Car Segment
 Car classifications
 Executive car

Notes

References 

Euro car segments